The 1994 SEC men's basketball tournament took place from March 10–13 at the Pyramid Arena in Memphis, Tennessee. The entire tournament, including the SEC Championship Game, was televised by Jefferson Pilot Sports, which at the time was in its seventh season with the syndication rights to the SEC. Play-by-play commentary was provided by Tom Hammond and Barry Booker, with sideline reports provided by Dave Baker, and Bob Kesling with the halftime reports. 

The Kentucky Wildcats won the SEC Tournament for an overall 19th SEC Tournament title, and receiving the automatic bid to the 1994 NCAA Men’s Division I Basketball Tournament by defeating the Florida Gators 73–60.

Bracket

References

SEC men's basketball tournament
1993–94 Southeastern Conference men's basketball season
1994 in sports in Tennessee
Basketball in Nashville, Tennessee
College sports tournaments in Tennessee